Barry Capuano (born 26 November 1940) is a former Australian rules footballer who played with Essendon in the VFL.

Wingman Barry Capuano played in a losing Grand Final in his debut season before becoming an Essendon premiership player in 1962. He made his last appearance for the club in 1966 and went on to serve in various administrative roles at Essendon.

External links

1940 births
Australian rules footballers from Victoria (Australia)
Essendon Football Club players
Essendon Football Club Premiership players
Eltham Football Club players
Living people
One-time VFL/AFL Premiership players
Essendon Football Club administrators